Lepidochrysops aethiopia is a butterfly in the family Lycaenidae. It is found in Malawi, Zambia and northern Mozambique. The habitat consists of deciduous woodland, usually on small, rocky hillsides.

The wingspan is about 50 mm. The upperside of both wings of the males is pale bluish violet with a tinge of lilac. In females, both wings are brown with the basal three-fifths suffused with violet-blue scales up to the middle of the cell. The forewings in both sexes have a deep black dash closing the cell, and broadish dark termen. The hindwings have a linear black termen preceded by a row of terminal spots. The underside of both wings is very pale whitish grey with pale brown markings broadly edged with white. Adults have been recorded in November and from to January to March.

References

Butterflies described in 1923
Lepidochrysops